Daniel Polidoro Mameri (born April 4, 1972 in São Paulo) is a  Pan American Games water polo player from Brazil.

References
 Profile 

1972 births
Living people
Brazilian male water polo players
Water polo players from São Paulo
Pan American Games silver medalists for Brazil
Pan American Games bronze medalists for Brazil
Pan American Games medalists in water polo
Water polo players at the 1991 Pan American Games
Water polo players at the 1995 Pan American Games
Water polo players at the 2003 Pan American Games
Water polo players at the 2007 Pan American Games
Medalists at the 1991 Pan American Games
Medalists at the 1995 Pan American Games
Medalists at the 2003 Pan American Games
Medalists at the 2007 Pan American Games
South American champions
20th-century Brazilian people
21st-century Brazilian people